The Verdin Company is a manufacturer of bronze bells, clocks and towers based in Cincinnati, Ohio in the United States.  The company has been making bells for use in bell and clock towers, peals, chimes, and carillons since 1842.  They also manufacture electronic carillons, street clocks, glockenspiels, and monuments.  There is now an organ division serving churches and other institutions combining organ and bell music. 

The Verdin Company is headquartered in an historic five-building church complex in the Over the Rhine neighborhood in Cincinnati.  The complex and church were  restored in 1983 and now include the Bell Event Centre .

Notable installations

The World Peace Bell in Newport, Kentucky, United States (33,285 kg / 73,381 lbs. with a width of 12 feet / 3.7 m); it was cast in 1999 under Verdin's direction by the Paccard Foundry near Annecy, France.  Other notable installations include the Basilica of the National Shrine of the Immaculate Conception, the Smithsonian Institution, the Canadian Parliament Buildings and Walt Disney World Resort, and the 88 bronze bells cast for the Ohio Bicentennial.  

They also crafted a 24-inch brass bell for the Seaport Shrine in Boston.<ref>

See also
 Bellfounding and clock making

References

External links

 The Verdin Company website

 
Bell foundries of the United States
Manufacturing companies based in Cincinnati